A chamfer  or  is a transitional edge between two faces of an object.  Sometimes defined as a form of bevel, it is often created at a 45° angle between two adjoining right-angled faces.

Chamfers are frequently used in machining, carpentry, furniture, concrete formwork, mirrors, and to facilitate assembly of many mechanical engineering designs.

Terminology
In machining the word bevel is not used to refer to a chamfer. Machinists use chamfers to "ease" otherwise sharp edges, both for safety and to prevent damage to the edges.

A chamfer may sometimes be regarded as a type of bevel, and the terms are often used interchangeably.

In furniture-making, a lark's tongue is a chamfer which ends short of a piece in a gradual outward curve, leaving the remainder of the edge as a right angle.  Chamfers may be formed in either inside or outside adjoining faces of an object or room.

By comparison, a fillet is the rounding-off of an interior corner, and a round (or radius) the rounding of an outside one.

Carpentry and furniture
Chamfers are used in furniture such as counters and table tops to ease their edges to keep people from bruising themselves in the otherwise sharp corner. When the edges are rounded instead, they are called bullnosed.  Special tools such as chamfer mills and chamfer planes are sometimes used.

Architecture

Chamfers are commonly used in architecture, both for functional and aesthetic reasons.  For example, the base of the Taj Mahal is a cube with chamfered corners, thereby creating an octagonal architectural footprint.  Its great gate is formed of chamfered base stones and chamfered corbels for a balcony or equivalent cornice towards the roof.

Urban planning
Many city blocks in Barcelona, Valencia and various other cities in Spain, and street corners (curbs) in Ponce, Puerto Rico, are chamfered. The chamfering was designed as an embellishment and a modernization of urban space in Barcelona's mid-19th century Eixample or Expansion District, where the buildings follow the chamfering of the sidewalks and streets. This pioneering design opens up broader perspectives, provides pleasant pedestrian areas and allows for greater visibility while turning. It might also be considered to allow for turning to be somewhat more comfortable as, supposedly, drivers would not need to slow down as much when making a turn as they would have to if the corner were a square 90 degrees, though in Barcelona, most chamfered corners are used as parking spaces or loading-unloading zones, leaving the traffic to run as in normal 90-degree street corners.

Mechanical engineering
Chamfers are frequently used to facilitate assembly of parts which are designed for interference fit or to aid assembly for parts inserted by hand. Resilient materials such as fluid power seals generally require a shallower angle than 45 degrees, often 20. In assemblies, chamfers are also used to clear an interior radius - perhaps from a cutting tool, or to clear other features, such as a weld bead, on an adjoining part.  This is because it is generally easier to manufacture and much easier to precisely check the dimensions of a chamfer than a radius, and errors in the profile of either radius could otherwise cause interference between the radii before the flat surfaces make contact with one another.
Chamfers are also essential for components which humans will handle, to prevent injuries, and also to prevent damage to other components. This is particularly important for hard materials, like most metals, and for heavy assemblies, like press tools.
Additionally, a chamfered edge is much more resistant than a square edge to being bruised by other edges or corners knocking against it during assembly or disassembly, or maintenance.

Machining

In machining a chamfer is a slope cut at any right-angled edge of a workpiece, e.g. holes; the ends of rods, bolts, and pins; the corners of the long-edges of plates; any other place where two surfaces meet at a sharp angle. Chamfering eases assembly, e.g. the insertion of bolts into holes, or nuts. Chamfering also removes sharp edges which reduces significantly the possibility of cuts, and injuries, to people handling the metal piece.

Glass mirror design
Outside of aesthetics, chamfering is part of the process of hand-crafting a parabolic glass telescope mirror. Before the surface of the disc can be ground, the edges must first be chamfered to prevent edge chipping. This can be accomplished by placing the disc in a metal bowl containing silicon carbide and rotating the disc with a rocking motion. The grit will thus wear off the sharp edge of the glass.

References

External links

Electronic design
Electronic engineering
Metalworking terminology
Woodworking